Francois Breault (born May 11, 1967) is a Canadian retired professional ice hockey player who played 27 games in the National Hockey League for the Los Angeles Kings between 1990 and 1992.

Biography
Breault was born in Acton Vale, Quebec. As a youth, he played in the 1979 Quebec International Pee-Wee Hockey Tournament with a minor ice hockey team from Acton Vale.

He played for the Los Angeles Kings during the 1990–91 and the 1991–92 seasons. During his NHL career he played 27 games, scoring 2 goals along with 4 assists. Along with the Kings, Breault also played for the Phoenix Roadrunners and Utica Devils during the 1992–93 season. His final season came in England during 1993-94 playing for the Durham Wasps.

Breault suffered an injury to his Anterior cruciate ligament 17 games into the 1990–91 season which caused him to miss the remainder of the season. The injury likely cut his playing career much shorter than it would otherwise have been.

Career statistics

Regular season and playoffs

References

External links
 

1967 births
Living people
Canadian ice hockey coaches
Canadian ice hockey right wingers
Chicoutimi Saguenéens (QMJHL) players
Drummondville Voltigeurs coaches
Granby Bisons players
Ice hockey people from Quebec
Los Angeles Kings players
Maine Mariners players
People from Montérégie
Phoenix Roadrunners (IHL) players
Trois-Rivières Draveurs players
Undrafted National Hockey League players
Utica Devils players